The Altria Theater in Richmond, Virginia, United States is a theater at the southwest corner of Monroe Park on the campus of Virginia Commonwealth University, and is the largest venue of Richmond CenterStage's performing arts complex. Formerly known as The Mosque and the Landmark Theater, the Altria Theater was originally built for Shriners of the Acca Temple Shrine.

In 1940, the building was purchased by the City of Richmond, which converted much of its interior for municipal use. The Richmond Police Department occupied the theater's basement, where they opened up office space, classrooms, a gymnasium, and a shooting range for the police academy. An underground swimming pool was also maintained, initially for training purposes, until it was filled in with concrete during the 2014 renovation.  Many are familiar with the basement of the Mosque as the location for VCU class registration, which occurred several times each year.  

The name of the theater was changed in 1995 from "The Mosque" to "Landmark Theater" following a year of restoration. After a $10 million renovation gift from the company, the theater was officially dubbed the Altria Theater in February 2014. It annually plays host to big-name musical and theatrical performers.

The theater was designed in Moorish Revival style by Marcellus E. Wright Sr. in association with Charles M. Robinson and Charles Custer Robinson circa 1925. J. R. Ray, of the Richmond Tile and Mosaic Works, was responsible for the widely used ornamental tile, and J. Frank Jones, of the Rambusch Decorating Company, oversaw the interior decoration. The building officially opened in 1927, and was dedicated by the Shriners in 1928.

Performers such as Elvis Presley, Jimi Hendrix, Bill Burr, Grateful Dead, Bruce Springsteen, Frank Sinatra, Roy Buchanan, B B King, Widespread Panic and The Supremes held shows at this venue. Notable Broadway performances such as Wicked, The Lion King, Les Miserables, and Cats have also been past visitors of The Altria Theater.

Statistics
 Theater capacity: 3,565 seats
 Ballroom capacity: 1,100 persons
 Ballroom dimensions:

References

External links
Private page with many pictures and detailed information about historic performances
Landmark Theater information page
Photographs of the theater's interior, 1950s

Masonic buildings completed in 1926
Theatres completed in 1926
Concert halls in the United States
Former Masonic buildings in Virginia
Moorish Revival architecture in Virginia
Theatres in Richmond, Virginia
Shriners
Historic district contributing properties in Virginia
1926 establishments in Virginia
National Register of Historic Places in Richmond, Virginia
Theatres on the National Register of Historic Places in Virginia
Public venues with a theatre organ